The Farnham Pirates were a minor league baseball team located in Farnham, Quebec, Canada. They played in the Provincial League from 1948 to 1951. The team was managed by Sam Bankhead, who was a player-manager. He was the first black coach in Minor League Baseball.

Outfielder Fred Thomas played 58 games in the 1948 season batting .351 which caught the attention of Major League Baseball scouts. He was selected by the Cleveland Indians to join the Wilkes-Barre  Barons farm-team who played in the Eastern League, where he was the first black player in the league.

References

Defunct minor league baseball teams
Defunct baseball teams in Canada
Baseball teams in Quebec
Baseball teams established in 1948
1948 establishments in Quebec
1951 disestablishments in Quebec
Sports clubs disestablished in 1951
Baseball teams disestablished in 1951